The World Snowshoe Federation (WSSF), formerly the International Snowshoe Federation (ISF or ISSF), is the world governing body for Snowshoe running. 

In 2015, the organization changed its name to the World Snowshoe Federation, so as not to be confused with other existing international federations: ISSF (International Shooting Sport Federation) and ISF (International Skyrunning Federation).

World Championships
The WSSF governs the World Snowshoe Running Championships, which is hosted annually in different locations around the world. The World Snowshoe Running Championships have been held every year, since 2006, except for 2008, 2009, 2021.

See also
 Snowshoe running World Championships

References

External links
 World Snowshoe Federation (WSSF) official web site

Snowshoe running
International sports organizations
International organisations based in Switzerland